Aclypea undata is a species of beetle belonging to the family Silphidae.

It is native to Europe.

References

Silphidae